Eunus Ali Sarkar (15 June 1953 – 27 December 2019) was a Bangladesh Awami League politician who served as a Jatiya Sangsad member representing the Gaibandha-3 constituency.

Early life
Sarkar was born on 15 June 1953. He completed his M.B.B.S. from Rangpur Medical College.

Career
Sarkar was elected to the parliament on 5 January 2014 from Gaibandha-3 as a Bangladesh Awami League candidate. In 2016, he asked the government to provide Eid bonus for Members of Parliament.

Death
Sarkar died on 27 December 2019 from lung cancer at the age of 66 at Bangabandhu Sheikh Mujib Medical University hospital, Dhaka.

References

1953 births
2019 deaths
Awami League politicians
10th Jatiya Sangsad members
11th Jatiya Sangsad members
Deaths from lung cancer
Deaths from cancer in Bangladesh
People from Gaibandha District